"Dance (With U)" is the second single released by British R&B singer Lemar and his first for Sony Music UK after coming third place in the BBC show Fame Academy. The single became a hit in the United Kingdom, peaking at number two on the UK Singles Chart in 2003. Elsewhere, the song reached number six in New Zealand and became a top-40 hit in Ireland, Italy, and the Netherlands.

Track listings

UK CD1
 "Dance (With U)" (radio edit) – 3:08
 "Dance (With U)" (Blacksmith R&B rub featuring Jahzell) – 4:38
 "Dance (With U)" (JD aka Dready remix) – 4:18
 "Dance (With U)" (video)

UK CD2
 "Dance (With U)" (album version) – 3:44
 "Dance (With U)" (Full Intention vocal mix) – 6:29
 "All I Ever Do (My Boo)" (album version) – 3:26

UK cassette single
 "Dance (With U)" (radio edit) – 3:08
 "All I Ever Do (My Boo)" (album version) – 3:26

Australian CD1
 "Dance (With U)" (radio edit) – 3:08
 "I Believe in a Thing Called Love" – 3:33
 "Dance (With U)" (JD aka Dready remix) – 4:18
 "Dance (With U)" (Blacksmith R&B rub) – 4:38

Australian CD2
 "Dance (With U)" (radio edit) – 3:08
 "Dance (With U)" (Blacksmith R&B rub featuring Jahzell) – 4:38
 "Dance (With U)" (Kardinal Beats 'live' remix) – 4:17
 "Dance (With U)" (JD aka Dready remix) – 4:18

Charts

Weekly charts

Year-end charts

Release history

References

2003 singles
2003 songs
Epic Records singles
Lemar songs
Songs written by Lemar
Sony Music UK singles